Damascena may refer to:

 Nigella damascena, annual garden flowering plant
 Rosa damascena, rose hybrid
 Iris damascena, a flowering bulb

See also
Damascene (disambiguation)